Lelio Popo (Lit: Radio Grandma) is a Malaysia-Singaporean film directed by Adrian Teh. It was released in Malaysian cinemas on 2 December 2010  and in Singapore cinemas on 13 January 2011. Lelio Popo made an estimated 850,000 Singapore dollars at the box office.

References

2010 films
Malaysian comedy films
Singaporean comedy films
Chinese-language Malaysian films
Cathay-Keris Films films